Clare Island ( or Oileán Chliara), also historically Inishcleer, is a mountainous island guarding the entrance to Clew Bay in County Mayo, Ireland. Historically part of the kingdom of Umhaill, it is famous as the home of the 16th century pirate queen Gráinne O'Malley. The current population of the island is roughly 160.

To the south-west lies Inishturk (inhabited) and Caher Island (uninhabited), and to the north is Achill Island.

History 

Through the Middle Ages, Clare Island was part of the lands of the O'Malley family. The ruins of an O'Malley tower-house, known as Granuaile's Castle because of its most famous resident, are close to the pier at the eastern edge of the island. Clare Island Abbey near the south coast of the island was founded by the O'Malleys and contains the O'Malley Tomb, a possible burial site of Gráinne O'Malley. The Abbey is known for its rare medieval roof paintings. In 1588, a ship from the Spanish Armada was wrecked on Clare Island and its men were killed by the O'Malleys.

A very prominent landmark of the island is the Clare Island Lighthouse, established by John Denis Browne, the 1st Marquess of Sligo, in 1806. On 29 September 1813 a fire, caused by careless disposal of the oil-lamp wicks, destroyed part of the tower and the lantern. The rebuilt light was ready in 1818. 

In 1834, the tower was struck by lightning. After 159 years of faithful service the lighthouse was taken out of service on 28 September 1965, replaced by the modern Achillbeg Island lighthouse on the south side of Achill Island.

Clare Island Lighthouse has been refurbished and is now an upmarket guesthouse, while its optic is on permanent rotating display at the World of Glass museum and visitor centre in North West England.

Demographics 
The table below reports data on Clare Island's population taken from Discover the Islands of Ireland (Alex Ritsema, Collins Press, 1999) and the Census of Ireland.

Fauna and Flora
Between 1909 and 1911, the Belfast naturalist Robert Lloyd Praeger led an exhaustive biological survey of the island, the Clare Island Survey, which was unprecedented at the time and served as a template for future studies.
A new study of the Island was made in 1990 to 2005 and the results were published in six volumes, the last of which was published in 2007. This is reputedly the only survey of its kind in Europe and is serving as a model for measuring the effects of climate change on environment.

Algae
Three species of freshwater red algae have been recorded from Clare Island: Batrachospermum atrum (Hudson) Harvey, B. turfosum Bory and Lemanea fucina Bory.

Transportation and Infrastructure 
Clare Island is accessible by daily ferry services from Roonagh Pier near Louisburgh. The island has a hostel, a few bed and breakfasts and a yoga and meditation centre. The island also has a bicycle rental facility.

The island has its own primary school and a post office. Children go to the mainland for secondary school education. The harbour, located on the SE of the island, offers good shelter in all winds with West in them, but is completely open to easterly winds. The piers are not suitable for yachts to come alongside but in the summer Mayo county council maintains a number of moorings for visiting yachts. The inner harbour dries out with a sandy bottom.

Culture
The island features in the song "Clare Island" by the Irish folk-rock band, the Saw Doctors from their 1996 album, Same Oul' Town. In the song, the island is described as a haven from hectic city life. It is also mentioned in the lyrics of the song "The Green and Red of Mayo".

Clare Island is the setting for Bob Quinn's film Budawanny (1987). He also shot a documentary on Clare Island, titled The Island, in 1966.

Clare Island is the setting for the Michael Morpurgo book The Ghost of Grania O'Malley.

The Clare Island Film Festival has been run annually since 2014.

Gallery

See also
Caher Island
Inishturk

References

External links

 Information site on Clare Island, updated regularly with news and events
 Another information site on Clare Island, maintained by an islander
 In this series of podcasts on Mayo's Heritage, an excerpt can be heard from Ger Reidy's visit to Clare Island as part of his Heritage Tour of Clew Bay

Islands of County Mayo